NK Omladinac is a football club from Vranjic, near Split, Croatia. The club was founded in 1914 with the name Uskok. In 1937, the name was changed to Omladinac. It plays in First league of Split-Dalmatia County.

The supporters call themselves "Plave murine".

References

Further reading
 

Football clubs in Croatia
Football clubs in Split-Dalmatia County
Association football clubs established in 1914
1914 establishments in Croatia